Aegina is an island of Greece.

Aegina may also refer to:

Aegina (genus), a genus of jellyfish
Aegina (mythology), a nymph in Greek mythology
Aegina, a character in the Khachaturian ballet Spartacus
91 Aegina, a large main belt asteroid

See also 
 Agena (disambiguation)